Vatica teysmanniana is a species of plant in the family Dipterocarpaceae. It is a tree endemic to Sumatra. It is threatened by habitat loss.

References

teysmanniana
Endemic flora of Sumatra
Trees of Sumatra
Critically endangered flora of Asia
Taxonomy articles created by Polbot
Taxa named by William Burck